Comedy 23/6 was a satirical news and opinion website developed by HuffPost, launched on November 9, 2007. Published by Arianna Huffington and edited by former The Daily Show writer Jason Reich, the site featured daily news coverage, original video, and a group blog known as "The Room."

Bloggers for the site have included Bill Maher, Tracey Ullman, Mike Birbiglia, Taylor Negron, Greg Fitzsimmons, and Paula Poundstone.

Video producers for the site include Eugene Mirman, H. Jon Benjamin, Jon Glaser, David Rees, A.D. Miles, Patrick Borelli, Julie Klausner, Jenny Slate, Larry Murphy, Max Silvestri, Todd Barry, Joe Mande and Sam Seder.

Dickipedia

Dickipedia – A Wiki of Dicks was a parody collection of satirical biographies "about people who are dicks". It is self-described as "a monolingual (English), Web-based, free content encyclopedia project, …[which] does not contain information about people who are detectives".

The first entry was Mitch McConnell. Bikram Choudhury was also featured.

References

External links
 

American comedy websites
American political blogs
Internet properties established in 2007
MediaWiki websites